Samson Ramengmawia (born 1985) is an Indian football coach and former football player. He played for Mohammedan S.C. in the I-League as a midfielder.

Ramengmawia was appointed the head coach of the Mizoram team for the 2022–23 Santosh Trophy season.

References

External links
 http://goal.com/en-india/people/india/29499/samson-ramengmawia
 http://www.indianfootball.com/en/statistic/player/detail/playerId/1219

Indian footballers
1985 births
Living people
Shillong Lajong FC players
Mohammedan SC (Kolkata) players
I-League players
Footballers from Mizoram
Association football midfielders
Indian football coaches